The Gros Ventre River (pronounced GROW-VAUNT) is a  tributary of the Snake River in the state of Wyoming, USA. During its short course, the river flows to the east, north, west, then southwest. It rises in the Gros Ventre Wilderness in western Wyoming, and joins the Snake River in the Jackson Hole valley. In 1925, the massive Gros Ventre landslide dammed the river and formed Lower Slide Lake. The natural dam collapsed in 1927, flooding the downstream town of Kelly, Wyoming.

References

Rivers of Wyoming
Rivers of Teton County, Wyoming
Tributaries of the Snake River
Wild and Scenic Rivers of the United States